The 2021–22 season is the 125th season in the existence of Willem II and the club's eighth consecutive season in the top flight of Dutch football. In addition to the domestic league, Willem II will participate in this season's editions of the KNVB Cup.

Players

First-team squad

Out on loan

Transfers

In

Out

Pre-season and friendlies

Competitions

Overall record

Eredivisie

League table

Results summary

Results by round

Matches
The league fixtures were announced on 11 June 2021.

KNVB Cup

References

Willem II (football club) seasons
Willem II